Sum Ting Wong is the stage name of Bo Zeng, a drag queen from Birmingham. She is best known for her appearance on the first series of RuPaul's Drag Race UK.

Early life
Bo Zeng was born in Birmingham to Vietnamese immigrant parents of Chinese descent.

Career
Sum Ting Wong's name comes from an incident in 2013, when KTVU in San Francisco aired stereotypical Chinese-sounding gag names of the Asiana Airlines Flight 214 pilots including "Sum Ting Wong" (something wrong), "Wi Tu Lo" (we [are] too low) and "Ho Lee Fuk" (holy fuck). Wong has said she chose to reappropriate the name for herself to reflect her British Vietnamese heritage. She competed on the first series of RuPaul's Drag Race UK.

Outside of Drag Race, she is a Twitch streamer and musician.

Filmography

Television
 RuPaul's Drag Race UK (series 1)

References

External links

Year of birth missing (living people)
Living people
20th-century English LGBT people
21st-century English LGBT people
British people of Chinese descent
British people of Vietnamese descent
English drag queens
English people of Vietnamese descent
Gay entertainers
People from Birmingham, West Midlands
RuPaul's Drag Race UK contestants